Parabroscus is a genus of ground beetles in the family Carabidae. There are at least two described species in Parabroscus.

Species
These two species belong to the genus Parabroscus:
 Parabroscus crassipalpis (Bates, 1873)  (Japan)
 Parabroscus teradai Habu, 1978  (Taiwan and temperate Asia)

References

Platyninae